Horner Houses, also known as the Earl Horner House and Charles Horner House, are two historic homes located at Burlington, Alamance County, North Carolina. The Earl Horner House was built about 1921, and is a two-story bungalow form frame dwelling. It features a gable-roofed porch.  The Charles Horner House dates to 1924, and is a two-story, stuccoed frame dwelling in the Mission/Spanish Revival style.  It features 66 windows and porches with terra cotta tiled floors. Earl Horner served as Burlington's mayor from 1919 until 1944.

It was added to the National Register of Historic Places in 1984.

References

Houses on the National Register of Historic Places in North Carolina
Colonial Revival architecture in North Carolina
Houses completed in 1924
Buildings and structures in Burlington, North Carolina
National Register of Historic Places in Alamance County, North Carolina
Houses in Alamance County, North Carolina